Sopota is a small dispersed settlement north of Dole pri Litiji in the Municipality of Litija in central Slovenia. The area is part of the traditional region of Lower Carniola and is now included with the rest of the municipality in the Central Sava Statistical Region.

History
Sopota was a hamlet of Dobovica until 1995, when it became a separate settlement.

References

External links
Sopota on Geopedia

Populated places in the Municipality of Litija